The 2020–21 North West Counties Football League season was the 39th in the history of the North West Counties Football League, a football competition in England, and the third season following the split of the lower level into two geographically separated divisions. Teams are divided into three divisions: Premier Division, at Step 5, and Divisions One North and South, at Step 6.

The allocations for Steps 5 and 6 for season 2020–21 were announced by the Football Association on 21 July, and were subject to appeal. On 6 August, it was announced by the League that the season would start no earlier than Saturday 3 October. The season was later suspended in December as a result of the COVID-19 pandemic in England. It was subsequently abandoned on 24 February 2021.

Premier Division 

The Premier Division comprised 20 teams, the same set of teams which competed in the previous season's aborted competition.

Rylands changed its name to Warrington Rylands 1906.

Premier Division table 
Prior to the first match(es) being played the Pos column shows alphanumeric sequence of teams rather than league position.

Premier Division results

Stadia and locations

Division One North 

Division One North comprised 19 clubs, 18 of which were in the division the previous season.
 Shelley resigned shortly before the season began
 Emley AFC was transferred back to the Northern Counties East League, having spent just one season in this league
 Bury AFC, a newly formed phoenix club, was included in this division

Division One North table 
Prior to the first match(es) being played the Pos column shows alphabetic sequence of teams rather than league position.

Division One North results

Stadia and locations

Division One South 

Division One South comprised 20 clubs, 19 of which were in the division the previous season.
 FC Oswestry Town resigned before the start of this season, and subsequently folded.
 FC Isle of Man's application to join the English football league system was successful, and the team was placed in this division. However, the club agreed to have its playing membership in the league suspended by mutual consent for the rest of this season because of COVID-19 pandemic-related travel restrictions on the Isle of Man.

Division One South table 
Prior to the first match(es) being played the Pos column shows alphabetic sequence of teams rather than league position.

Division One South results

Stadia and locations

League Challenge Cup 
Also called the Macron Challenge Cup for sponsorship reasons.
Sources for this section: fixtures and results

This competition is open to all teams in the league. However, due to irregularities in the previous season, AFC Darwen forfeited a place in the competition this season

The competition was suspended for this season and eventually cancelled in February 2021.

Division One Trophy 
The competition was also suspended for this season and later cancelled in February 2021.

All the remaining Division One teams received a bye to the second round.

Second round

Third round

Quarter-finals

Semi-finals

First leg

Second leg

Final 

-->

Division One Champions Cup 
This would have been played at the end of the season between the winners of Division One North and Division One South. It too was cancelled in February 2021.

References

External links 
 The Official Website of The North West Counties League

North West Counties Football League seasons
9
North West Counties Football League, 2020-21